Galerga is a genus of skipper butterflies in the family Hesperiidae.

Species
The following species are recognised in the genus Galerga:
Galerga ellipsis (Saalmüller, 1884)
Galerga fito Evans, 1937
Galerga hyposticta Mabille, 1898

References

Astictopterini